Axton may refer to:

 Axton, Virginia, an unincorporated community in the United States
 Axton, an alternative spelling for Axstane, the Hundred in Kent
 Axton (surname)
 Axton (character), the name of a Borderlands 2 character